Mithu Chakrabarty is an Indian television actress and theater personality. She is the wife of veteran Bengali actor Sabyasachi Chakrabarty.

Filmography
 Tenida and Co. (upcoming)
 Mrs Chatterjee Vs Norway
 Mini (2022)
 Bornoporichoy (2019)
 Anurup/Mirror Image (Short Film) (2019)
 Crisscross (2018)
 Pari (2018)
 Bibaho Diaries (2017)
 M.S. Dhoni The Untold Story (2016)
 Rupkatha Noy (2013)
 Tor Naam (2012)
 Muktodhara (2012)
 Chaplin (2011)
 Ajob Prem Ebong (2011)
 Icche (2011)
 The Bong Connection
 Anuranan
 Ek Tukro Chand (2001)
 Ballygunge Court
 Dosar
 Ek je Achhe Kanya
 Box No. 1313
 Aamra
 Teen Ekke Teen
 Ami Aadu

Television

Web series

References

External links 
 

21st-century Indian actresses
Indian film actresses
Indian television actresses
Actresses in Bengali cinema
Bengali television actresses
Living people
Actresses from Kolkata
Year of birth missing (living people)
Bengali actresses
Bengali Hindus